Scrine is a surname. Notable people with the surname include:

Frank Scrine (1925–2001), Welsh footballer
Fred Scrine (1877–1962), Welsh rugby union player

See also
Catching Lives